Rajendra Prasad Lingden is a Nepali politician and former Deputy Prime Minister of Nepal, also served as the  Minister of Energy, Water Resources and Irrigation. He is also the chairman of the Rastriya Prajatantra Party. He served as a member of the 1st Federal Parliament of Nepal from March 2018. He was re-elected in 2022 in 2nd Federal Parliament of Nepal.

Early life and education
Rajendra Lingden was born in Amarpur in Panchthar district  to Dhan Kumari and Man Prasad Lingden. He married with Sita Thapa Lingden. They have one daughter and two sons. Rajendra involved in politics when he was young. He has completed his Master degree from Tribhuvan University. He was also nominated in the position of chairman of District Development Committee Jhapa during the direct rule of king Gyanendra. He did development sector work in jhapa-3 which made him more popular in his local constituency.

Career
Rajendra Lingden defeated Krishna Prasad Sitaula who worked under Girija Prasad Koirala. Sitaula was considered Koirala's right-hand person to bring Maoists, UML and other parties together.

Rajendra was involved in RPP Politics from the beginning of party establishment. He worked in several portfolio within his RPP Party. He was also founding president of “Rastriya Prajatantrik Bidhyaarthi Sangathan”. He worked as a RPP General Secretary before contesting for the position of president. In 2021, Lingden was elected as the chairman of Rastriya Prajatantra Party by defeating his existing chairman.Kamal Thapa. Lingden got 1,844 votes while Kamal Thapa got 1,617 votes. A total of 413 votes were invalidated. Stating that he would accept defeat, Thapa tweeted and congratulated Lingden on his victory.

After the extraordinary performance by Rastriya Prajatantra Party in 2022 Nepalese general election where RPP won 14 seats. Rastriya Prajatantra Party (RPP) decided to join the current coalition government under the leadership of RPP Chairman Rajendra Lingden, where he become Deputy Prime Minister and Minister of energy, Water Resources and Irrigation.

Electoral history 
In the 2017 Nepalese general election, he was elected from the Jhapa 3 constituency, securing 44614 (56.52%) votes.

In the 2022 Nepalese general election, he was elected from the Jhapa 3 constituency, securing 40,662 (47.94%) votes.

References

Nepal MPs 2017–2022
Living people
Rastriya Prajatantra Party politicians
People from Panchthar District
Rastriya Prajatantra Party Nepal politicians
1965 births
Nepal MPs 2022–present